Victor Alexander George Robert Bulwer-Lytton, 2nd Earl of Lytton,  (9 August 1876 – 25 October 1947), styled Viscount Knebworth from 1880 to 1891, was a British politician and colonial administrator. He served as Governor of Bengal between 1922 and 1927 and was briefly Acting Viceroy of India in 1926. He headed the Lytton Commission for the League of Nations, in 1931–32, producing the Lytton Report which condemned Japanese aggression against China in Manchuria.

Early life
He was born in Simla in British India on 9 August 1876, during the time when his father was Viceroy of India. Lytton was the fourth, but eldest surviving, son of Robert Bulwer-Lytton, 1st Earl of Lytton and Edith Villiers, daughter of Edward Ernest Villiers and granddaughter of George Villiers. His six siblings were Edward Rowland John Bulwer-Lytton (who died young), Lady Elizabeth Edith "Betty" Bulwer-Lytton (wife of Gerald Balfour, 2nd Earl of Balfour, the brother of the future Prime Minister Arthur Balfour), Lady Constance Bulwer-Lytton (a prominent suffragette), Henry Meredith Edward Bulwer-Lytton (who died young), Lady Emily Bulwer-Lytton (who married architect Edwin Lutyens), and Neville Bulwer-Lytton, 3rd Earl of Lytton. He was the grandson of the English novelist, writer, and politician Edward Bulwer-Lytton.

He was educated at Eton and Trinity College, Cambridge, where he was secretary of the University Pitt Club. In 1905 he was President of the Edinburgh Sir Walter Scott Club and gave the Toast to Sir Walter at the club's annual dinner.

Career

Lytton took his seat in the House of Lords as a Conservative in January 1902, where he was an advocate for female suffrage, being influenced by his sister, the suffragette, Lady Constance Bulwer-Lytton. He chaired the all-party ‘Conciliation Committee’ that drafted the Parliamentary Franchise (Women) Bill, known as the Conciliation Bill, in 1910. The wartime coalition gave Lytton the chance to hold government office, and he started his official career by filling various posts in the Admiralty between 1916 and 1920, before being appointed Under-Secretary of State for India, a post which he held between 1920 and 1922. He was made a Privy Counsellor in 1919. On 16 February 1922 he was posted as Governor of Bengal, remaining there until 3 March 1927.

For a short while, when there was a vacancy caused by change in incumbents in 1926, he functioned as Viceroy, his father's old post. After this he filled miscellaneous positions in various capacities when matters concerning India arose. He wrote two books, the first being a life of his grandfather Lord Lytton, while the other book dealt with his experiences in India and was called Pundits and Elephants, published in 1942. He was made a Knight of the Garter in 1933.

He was chairman of London Associated Electricity Undertakings Limited from 1937 to 1947.

Lytton is best known for his chairmanship of the Lytton Commission, which was sent by the League of Nations on a fact-finding mission to determine who was to blame in the 1931 war between Japan and China. The commission's Lytton Report, officially issued on 1 October 1932, blames Japanese aggression. In response Japan withdrew from the League of Nations.

Personal life
On 3 April 1902, Lord Lytton married Pamela Frances Audrey Chichele-Plowden (1874–1971) at St Margaret's, Westminster. Pamela was a daughter of Sir Trevor Chichele Plowden and Millicent Frances Foster (eldest daughter of Gen. Sir Charles John Foster KCB).  Her elder brother was Alfred Chichele Plowden. She had been an early flame of Winston Churchill, but that relationship was amicably broken off when she decided to marry Lytton instead.  Together, the couple were the parents of two sons, both of whom predeceased Lytton, and two daughters:

 Antony Bulwer-Lytton, Viscount Knebworth (1903–1933), an MP for Hitchin who died aged 30 in an air crash while serving with the Auxiliary Air Force. 
 Lady Margaret Hermione Millicent Bulwer-Lytton (1905–2004), who married Cameron Fromanteel Cobbold, who became a Governor of the Bank of England, Lord Chamberlain and Baron Cobbold in 1960.
 Lady Davidema Katharine Cynthia Mary Millicent Bulwer-Lytton (1909–1995), who married John Crichton, 5th Earl Erne in 1931. After his death, she married Christopher Woodhouse, 5th Baron Terrington in 1945.
 Alexander Edward John Bulwer-Lytton, Viscount Knebworth, MBE (1910–1942), who was killed in the Second Battle of El Alamein during World War II.

Lord Lytton died in October 1947, aged 71.  As neither of his sons had left a son, Lytton's titles were inherited upon his death by his younger brother Neville Bulwer-Lytton. Knebworth House passed to his daughter Lady Hermione Cobbold.

References

External links

 Portrait of Pamela Frances Audrey Bulwer-Lytton (née Chichele-Plowden), Countess of Lytton

1876 births
1947 deaths
19th-century English nobility
20th-century English nobility
Alumni of Trinity College, Cambridge
20th-century Royal Navy personnel
People from Shimla
Bailiffs Grand Cross of the Order of St John
Deputy Lieutenants of Hertfordshire
102
Knights Grand Commander of the Order of the Indian Empire
Knights Grand Commander of the Order of the Star of India
Knights of the Garter
Lords of the Admiralty
British governors of Bengal
Manchuria
Founders of Indian schools and colleges
Members of the Privy Council of the United Kingdom
Burials at Knebworth
Victor
Presidents of the Royal Society of Literature
People educated at Eton College
British people in colonial India